Steven Tsosie Plummer (August 14, 1944 - April 2, 2005) was bishop of the Navajoland Area Mission in the Episcopal Church of the United States of America from 1990 to 2005. He was also the first Navajo bishop of the Episcopal Church.

References 

1944 births
2005 deaths
Episcopal Church in Arizona
Episcopal Church in New Mexico
Episcopal Church in Utah
Navajo people
Native American Episcopalians
20th-century American Episcopalians
Episcopal bishops of Navajoland
20th-century American clergy
20th-century Native Americans
21st-century Native Americans